The Years is an EP and the first major release by Guelph, Ontario-based dream pop duo Memoryhouse, released on September 13, 2011. The Years is Memoryhouse's Sub Pop debut. The Years is a re-release of an EP by the same name released in February 2010 while Memoryhouse was signed to Arcade Sound, a very small independent record label.

Critical reception

Reception for The Years EP has been mixed. While many reviewers were very positive in regards to Memoryhouse's particular ambient sound, they noted that with so little music under their belt it seemed regressive that Memoryhouse release a redux of music they already recorded.

Track listing

References

External links
The Years at Sub Pop

2011 EPs
Memoryhouse albums
Dream pop EPs
Shoegaze EPs